D.750 is a north to south state road in Turkey. It starts at Zonguldak at the Black sea coast and ends at the junction of D.400 near Tarsus in the Mediterranean Region. It crosses many state roads (like D.100, D.715, D.300, D.330 and D.805).

Itinerary

Connections to motorways 
There are a number of connections to motorways of Turkey. Connections to O-4 are in Bolu and Ankara provinces. Connections to O-21 are in Konya, Adana and Mersin provinces and connection to O-51 is in Mersin province.

References and notes 

750
Transport in Zonguldak Province
Transport in Bolu Province
Transport in Ankara Province
Transport in Konya Province
Transport in Aksaray Province
Transport in Niğde Province
Transport in Adana Province
Transport in Mersin Province